Kalisha Keane (born February 3, 1989) is a Canadian professional basketball player. She currently plays for the Melbourne Boomers in Australia's WNBL.

Career

College
In college, Keane attended Michigan State University in East Lansing, Michigan for the Spartans. She participated in NCAA Division I, as a part of the Big Ten Conference. She was also named to the Kodak All-American Regional Team while also being the Big Ten Conference Player of the Year her senior year.

Michigan State statistics

Source

Europe
After college, Keane headed to Europe and signed with ŽKK Gospić in Croatia's A-1 Liga Žene. Towards the end of the season, she signed with Elitzur Holon in Israel's league. In January 2014, she returned to Israel, with Elitzur Netanya for two seasons. She then joined Antalya'nın Yıldızları in TKB2L. She returned to Turkey for the 2014–15 TKB2L season, this time with TED Ankara.

Australia
In November 2016, Keane signed with the Melbourne Boomers in Australia for the 2016–17 WNBL season. She was signed after the Boomers parted ways with their previous import, Chante Black.

National team
After a successful international career at Youth Level, Keane made her national team debut as a member of the team for the 2011 FIBA Americas Championship for Women in Colombia. She once again represented Canada at the 2013 FIBA Americas Championship for Women, in Mexico.

References

1989 births
Living people
Basketball players from Toronto
Canadian expatriate basketball people in Australia
Canadian expatriate basketball people in Croatia
Canadian expatriate basketball people in Israel
Canadian expatriate basketball people in Turkey
Canadian expatriate basketball people in the United States
Canadian women's basketball players
Forwards (basketball)
Melbourne Boomers players
Michigan State Spartans women's basketball players
Sportspeople from Scarborough, Toronto
Women's National Basketball League players